The Yugosphere (Macedonian, Slovene and ) is a concept created in 2009 by British writer Tim Judah during his time as a senior visiting fellow at the European Institute of the London School of Economics. The Yugosphere refers to the social, linguistic, economic and cultural ties between the successor nations of the former Yugoslavia and how following the breakup of Yugoslavia these ties and bonds are being reforged to the benefit of the whole region. Judah has described the Yugosphere as "a way of describing the renewal of thousands of broken bonds across the former state," a social and political phenomenon with a certain political application. The concept also calls for a Benelux or Nordic Council style organisation in the former Yugoslavia to promote cooperation and integration as well as unified policy stances and foreign policy in order to benefit all nations as well as speed up European Union integration.

Gallery

See also
 Western Balkans
 Berlin Process
 Brdo-Brijuni Process
 Open Balkan

References

Cultural regions
Legacy of Yugoslavia
Spheres of influence
Pan-Slavism